The King of Paris is a 1934 British drama film directed by Jack Raymond and starring Cedric Hardwicke, Marie Glory and Ralph Richardson. It is based on a play La Voie Lactee by Alfred Savoir based on the life of Sacha Guitry.

Plot
An influential actor and impresario discovers and makes a star of a Russian girl, falls in love with her and tricks her into marriage. She however, falls in love with his friend, and desires to leave the marriage.

Cast
 Cedric Hardwicke as Max Till
 Marie Glory as Maike Tamara
 Ralph Richardson as Paul Lebrun
 Phyllis Monkman as Gismonde
 O. B. Clarence as Mayor
 John Deverell as Bertrand
 Lydia Sherwood as Juliette Till
 Jeanne Stuart as Yvonne
 Joan Maude as Lea Rossignol

References

External links

1934 films
1934 drama films
British drama films
British black-and-white films
British and Dominions Studios films
Films shot at Imperial Studios, Elstree
British films based on plays
1930s English-language films
1930s British films